John Kirkland Clark, Sr. (January 21, 1877 - January 20, 1963) was a New York City assistant district attorney under  Charles S. Whitman, the New York County District Attorney. He was appointed to investigate and prosecute cases of corruption. He was president of the New York State Board of Law Examiners from 1921 his retirement in 1943.

Biography
He was born on January 21, 1877, in Springfield, Massachusetts to Kate Upson Clark. He died on January 20, 1963.

References

1877 births
1963 deaths
American lawyers